Milorad Pupovac (born 5 November 1955) is a Croatian politician and linguist. He is a member of the Sabor, the former president of the Serb National Council, and the president of the Independent Democratic Serb Party. He was also an observer at the European Parliament.

Education
Pupovac was born in Donje Ceranje near Benkovac. He graduated from the Faculty of Humanities and Social Sciences at the University of Zagreb. He holds a PhD in linguistics and is a professor at the University of Zagreb.

Political activity

He was one of the leading members of the Association for Yugoslav Democratic Initiative, and after that he was the leader of the League of Social Democrats and head of the Social Democrat Alliance of Croatia – Social Democrat Alliance of Yugoslavia. He was the founder of the Serb Democratic Forum and its first president until 1995.

At the beginning of 1995, he participated in the founding of the Independent Serb Party and of the Action of Social Democrats of Croatia. He was involved in the activity of that party and as their representative, he entered the Sabor after elections held in 1995. He cast the decisive vote needed to achieve the two-thirds majority necessary to amend the Croatian Constitution on 12 December 1997. It was the first amending of the Constitution since its adoption on 22 December 1990, and the major amendments included the investiture of the Croatian War of Independence into the Constitution's text, as well as the adoption of articles prohibiting the beginning of negotiations on Croatia's entrance into associations with any former Yugoslav republics and articles defining the national minorities of Croatia. After that, he founded the Independent Democratic Serb Party, led by Vojislav Stanimirović who was the mayor of Vukovar during the Croatian War of Independence.  On the list of that party, he was a candidate for the Croatian Parliament several times. He succeeded Stanimirović as the president of the party in July 2017.

References

1955 births
People from Benkovac
Serbs of Croatia
Serb Democratic Party (Croatia) politicians
Independent Democratic Serb Party politicians
Living people
Faculty of Humanities and Social Sciences, University of Zagreb alumni
Representatives in the modern Croatian Parliament
Pupovac